is a Japanese filmmaker and storyboard artist. He is one of the most successful Japanese filmmakers and the top tokusatsu film director.

Higuchi became known for his work on Gamera: Guardian of the Universe, for which he won the Special Technology Award at the 19th Japan Academy Film Prize. In 2005, he made his feature directorial debut on Lorelei: The Witch of the Pacific Ocean. His second feature film, Sinking of Japan (2006), was second place at the Bunshun Kiichigo Awards. His 2015 live-action two-part film adaptation of Hajime Isayama's manga series, Attack on Titan, won the Excellence in Theatrical Live Action Film award at the 2016 VFX-JAPAN Awards. In 2017, Higuchi and Hideaki Anno won the Director of the Year award at the 40th Japan Academy Film Prize, for their work on the 2016 kaiju film, Shin Godzilla. His 2022 film, Shin Ultraman, was a major success in Japan, and has received generally positive reviews from critics internationally.

Biography

Early life 
Higuchi was born on September 22, 1965, in Shinjuku, Tokyo, Japan. When Higuchi was in junior high school, his aunt took him on a tour of Toho Studios, where she worked on commercials. Upon watching Toho's special effects crew at work, Higuchi became inspired and frequently visited the filming sets.

Early career 
Higuchi entered the Japanese film industry in 1984, working as an assistant modeler on The Return of Godzilla. Two years later, he directed the special effects for Daicon's tokusatsu fan film Yamata no Orochi no Gyakushū.

As a key Daicon/Gainax member, he played an important part in the creation of one of the most popular anime series, Neon Genesis Evangelion (1995). He was a writer and art director/storyboarder for the series. He was also the namesake for the show's protagonist, Shinji Ikari. He later voice-acted a musician modeled after himself in two episodes of Karekano.

Higuchi made his directorial debut in 1992 with the disaster film The Day the Sun Fissured: The Great Tokyo Earthquake which he produced for Tokyo Fire Department.

Filmography

Accolades

References

External links
 
 
 

1965 births
Living people
Japanese film directors
Japanese animated film directors
Science fiction film directors
Gainax
Japanese animators
Tokusatsu
Special effects people
Japanese storyboard artists